The Hawker P.V.4 was a 1930s British biplane aircraft built by Hawker Aircraft in competition for a government order for a general-purpose military aircraft.

Design and development
In 1931, the British Air Ministry issued a their Specification G.4/31 for a "Standard General Purpose" aircraft. The duties were to include liaison, bombing (both day and night), dive bombing, torpedo bombing, and reconnaissance.

As none of the competing prototypes ordered for the competition could carry out all of the roles, and as individually aircraft of the Hawker Hart series could perform most of these duties, with the Hart having excellent handling in a dive, Hawkers decided to base their entry on the Hind development of the Hart. They built the P.V.4 as a private venture (i.e., with their own money) as a two-seat light bomber; although the bomb load of 570 lb (259 kg) was the same as the Hart, the reinforced fuselage and wings allowed the P.V.4 to dive with this load.

Testing
The P.V.4 was first flown from the Brooklands airfield on 6 December 1934. The Bristol Pegasus III engine was initially used, but this was changed to the Pegasus X in 1935. In trials, it proved to be the only one of the competitors to be fully suitable for dive-bombing; unfortunately, because of its cross-axle undercarriage, it could not carry a torpedo. The dive bombing duty was dropped from the specification, however, so the aircraft had little extra to offer and it lost out to the Vickers Wellesley monoplane which entered production.

Only one aircraft was built. This was eventually used for spinning tests, and then sent to Bristol Aeroplane to be used as an engine test bed, with several other engines being installed. The Finnish Air Force in the 1930s, evaluated different dive bombers including the Hawker P.V.4, eventually choosing the Fokker C.X light bomber. The sole P.V.4 prototype was struck off charge on 29 March 1939.

Specification (with the Pegasus X engine)

See also

References

Notes

Bibliography

 Hannah, Donald. Hawker FlyPast Reference Library. Stamford, Lincolnshire, UK: Key Publishing Ltd., 1982. .
 James, Derek N. Hawker, an Aircraft Album No. 5. New York: Arco Publishing Company, 1973. . (First published in the UK by Ian Allan in 1972.)
 Mason, Francis K. Hawker Aircraft since 1920. London: Putnam & Company, 3rd revised edition, 1991. .
 Mason, Francis K. The British Bomber since 1914. London: Putnam Aeronautical Books, 1994. .

External links
Hawker P.V.4 – British Aircraft Directory

1930s British bomber aircraft
PV04
Single-engined tractor aircraft
Biplanes
Aircraft first flown in 1934